Semen Novikov (born 11 December 1997 in Kharkiv)  is a Ukrainian Greco-Roman wrestler. He won the gold medal in the 87 kg event at the 2020 European Wrestling Championships held in Rome, Italy.

Career 

In 2019, he won the gold medal in the 87 kg event at the World U23 Wrestling Championship held in Budapest, Hungary. In 2020, he won one of the bronze medals in the 87 kg event at the Individual Wrestling World Cup held in Belgrade, Serbia.

In 2021, he won the gold medal in his event at the Wladyslaw Pytlasinski Cup held in Warsaw, Poland.

He won the gold medal in his event at the 2023 Dan Kolov & Nikola Petrov Tournament held in Sofia, Bulgaria.

Major results

References

External links 
 

Living people
1997 births
Sportspeople from Kharkiv
Ukrainian male sport wrestlers
European Wrestling Championships medalists
European Wrestling Champions
21st-century Ukrainian people